Kanlaya Sysomvang (born 3 November 1990 in Vientiane) is a former Laotian footballer and current coach who is currently the assistant manager of the Laos national football team, the Laos national under-23 football team and Young Elephants FC in the Lao League 1.He is the B-License coach of the Asian Football Confederation (AFC) and has been an assistant to the club in Laos' top league, now coaching the Lao Under-23 national team and the Lao national team.

Club career
In 2010, he signed for MCTPC, now known as Yotha FC. He played there for one season before signing with Thai side Khon Kaen in 2011.

International career
He represented Laos at the 2009 SEA Games and made his senior team debut in 2010.

References 

1990 births
Living people
Laotian footballers
Yotha F.C. players
Expatriate footballers in Thailand
Laos international footballers
Association football midfielders
Association football forwards